Christine Schneider (born 5 June 1972) is a German carpenter and politician of the Christian Democratic Union (CDU) who has been serving as a Member of the European Parliament since 2019.

Political career
From 1996 to 2019, Schneider served as a member of the Landtag of Rhineland-Palatinate. In that capacity, she chaired the Committee on Agriculture from 2006 until 2016 and served as deputy chairwoman of her parliamentary group from 2016 until 2019, under the leadership of chairman Christian Baldauf.

Schneider has been a Member of the European Parliament since the 2019 European elections. She has since been serving on the Committee on the Environment, Public Health and Food Safety and the Committee on Women's Rights and Gender Equality. In addition to her committee assignments, she is part of the Parliament's delegation for relations with South Africa.

Other activities
 Sparkasse Südliche Weinstraße, Member of the Supervisory Board

References

External links

1972 births
Living people
MEPs for Germany 2019–2024
21st-century women MEPs for Germany
Christian Democratic Union of Germany MEPs
People from Landau